Marcus Aurelius Olympius Nemesianus was a Roman poet thought to have been a native of Carthage and flourished about AD 283. He was a popular poet at the court of the Roman emperor Carus (Historia Augusta, Carus, 11).

Works
The works below are by, or sometimes attributed to, Nemesianus

Didactic poetry
Nemesianus wrote poems on the arts of fishing (Halieutica), aquatics (Nautica) and hunting (Cynegetica), but only a fragment of the last, 325 hexameter lines, has been preserved. It is neatly expressed in good Latin, and was used as a school textbook in the 9th century AD.

Two fragments exist of a poem about bird catching (De aucupio), which are sometimes attributed to Nemesianus, although this attribution is considered doubtful.

The Eclogues

Four eclogues, formerly attributed to Titus Calpurnius Siculus, are now generally considered to be by Nemesianus.

The Praise of Hercules
The Praise of Hercules, sometimes printed in Claudian's works, may be by him.

Editions
Complete edition of the works attributed to him in Emil Baehrens, Poetae Latini Minores, iii. (1881); Cynegetica: ed. Moritz Haupt (with Ovid's Halieutica and Grattius) 1838, and R. Stern, with Grattius (1832); Italian translation with notes by L. F. Valdrighi (1876). The four eclogues are printed with those of Calpurnius in the editions of H. Schenkl (1885) and Charles Haines Keene (1887); see L. Cisorio, Studio sulle Egloghe di Nemesiano (1895) and Dell' imitazione nelle Egloghe di Nemesiano (1896); and M. Haupt, De Carminibus Bucolicis Calpurnii et Nemesiani (1853), the chief treatise on the subject. The text of the Cynegetica, the Eclogues, and the doubtful Fragment on Bird-Catching were published in Vol. II of Minor Latin Poets (Loeb Classical Library with English translations (1934).

See also
Tiberianus (poet)

References

External links
Nemesianus, Latin text and English translations in the Loeb edition, at LacusCurtius.

Ancient Roman poets
Post–Silver Age Latin writers
3rd-century Romans
3rd-century poets
Aurelii
3rd-century Latin writers